Dovania is a genus of moths in the family Sphingidae. The genus was erected by Walter Rothschild and Karl Jordan in 1903

Species
Dovania dargei Pierre, 2000
Dovania mirei Pierre, 2000
Dovania neumanni Jordan 1925
Dovania poecila Rothschild & Jordan 1903

References

Sphingini
Moth genera
Taxa named by Walter Rothschild
Taxa named by Karl Jordan